There Is No-One What Will Take Care of You is the debut studio album by Will Oldham. It was released under the band name Palace Brothers on Drag City in 1993. Oldham is accompanied by several members of Louisville rock band Slint.

Critical reception

The album was included in Mojo magazine's book The Mojo Collection: The Greatest Albums of All Time (2001).

Track listing

Personnel
 Grant Barger – organ, acoustic guitar, bass guitar, background vocals
 Todd Brashear – lap steel guitar, electric guitar, bass guitar, drums, shakers, harmonies
 Paul Greenlaw – banjo, additional vocals
 Brian McMahan – electric guitar, bass guitar, drums
 Britt Walford – electric guitar, bass guitar, drums
 Will Oldham – vocals, guitar

References

External links
 

1993 debut albums
Will Oldham albums
Domino Recording Company albums
Drag City (record label) albums